Pepper Dennis is an American comedy-drama television series that aired on The WB from April 4 to July 4, 2006.  It was announced on May 17, 2006 that Pepper Dennis would not be one of the WB shows transferred to The CW. Pepper Dennis was the final show to premiere on the network before the rebrand.

Plot
The series stars Rebecca Romijn as Pepper Dennis, a television reporter for an evening news broadcast at the fictional television station WEiE (specifically with a small i) in Chicago. The series also starred Rider Strong as Chick, Pepper's cameraman who has an unrequited crush on her, Brooke Burns as Pepper's sheltered and somewhat flaky sister Kathy Dinkle, Lindsay Price as Kimmy Kim, Pepper's closest friend and WEiE's makeup artist and Josh Hopkins as Charlie Babcock, the station's news anchor. One of the focal points of the show was the love-hate relationship between Pepper and Charlie.

Cast

Regular cast

Recurring characters

Other characters

Production
The song used in commercials for the show was "Black Horse and the Cherry Tree" by KT Tunstall, and the opening theme song is "Better Half" by Chris Trapper, the former frontman for the Boston pop group The Push Stars. Another song that the WB used for advertising "Pepper Dennis" was Morningwood's "Nth Degree" which also appeared in another WB drama, One Tree Hill.

Episodes

References

External links
 
 
 
 Pepper Dennis review at People Magazine
 "X-Men" movie star hopes her TV series won't expire

2006 American television series debuts
2006 American television series endings
2000s American comedy-drama television series
2000s American romantic comedy television series
Television series about journalism
Television series by 20th Century Fox Television
Television shows set in Chicago
The WB original programming
English-language television shows